Sadaf Shamas (born 13 December 1998) is a Pakistani cricketer who plays as a right-handed batter.

International career
In May 2022, she was named in Women's One Day International (WODI) squads for Sri Lanka's tour of Pakistan. In September 2022, she was named Pakistan's squad for the Asia Cup.

Shamas made her WODI debut on 4 November 2022 against Ireland at Gaddafi Stadium, Lahore. She made her WT20I debut on 24 January 2023 against Australia at North Sydney Oval, Sydney.

In January 2023, Shamas was added to Pakistan's squad for the 2023 ICC Women's T20 World Cup. She replaced Diana Baig, who was ruled out of the squad due to a fractured finger.

References

External links
 
 

1998 births
Living people
Cricketers from Lahore
Pakistani women cricketers
Pakistan women One Day International cricketers
Pakistan women Twenty20 International cricketers
Lahore women cricketers
Higher Education Commission women cricketers